Masked Avengers is a Shaw Brothers film directed by Chang Cheh and produced by Mona Fong. It is one of the later Venom Mob films which no longer starred Sun Chien or Lo Mang, who were replaced by new Venom members Wang Li and Chu Ko. It also gave a starring role to younger member Chin Siu-Ho. This, along with House Of Traps and Five Element Ninjas is one of the more violent and darker martial arts films.

Plot

The insidious Masked Gang of hired killers have been terrorizing the countryside, with their mastery of the trident and an inherent brutality, raping and pillaging. But who are the men behind the mask, and what are the identities of the three chiefs in the gold masks? 

Chiang Sheng stars as Chi San Yuen, a martial arts expert and leader of a protective escort service of other expert fighters. Chi and his team are hired to find the Masked Gang and end their reign of terror. 

Along the way Chi's team encounter Kao Yao (Philip Kwok) who was a former chief of the Masked Gang until he left the gang. He assists Chi's team in their struggle against the Masked Gang and helps to reveal that his replacement in the gang has already infiltrated Chi's group. The final confrontation between the Masked Gang and Chi's team of fighters lead to an all out battle at the Masked Gang's secret lair.

Cast
Philip Kwok aka Kuo Chui – Kao Yao
Lu Feng – Lin Yung Chi
Chiang Sheng – Chi San Yuen
Chu Ko – Liang Yung
Chin Siu-Ho – Chang Chung (as Hsiao Hau Chien)
Wang Li – Fong Su Kwong

External links

IMDb entry
HK Cinemagic entry

Films directed by Chang Cheh
Kung fu films
1981 martial arts films
Shaw Brothers Studio films
1981 action films
Hong Kong martial arts films
Hong Kong action films
1981 films
1980s exploitation films
1980s Hong Kong films
Hong Kong exploitation films